"Lonely for You" is a song performed by Dutch DJ and record producer Armin van Buuren featuring American singer and songwriter Bonnie McKee. It was released on 15 February 2019 by the label Armada Music and Sony Music. A club mix was released on 18 February 2019.

Track listing

Charts

References

 

2019 singles
2019 songs
Armin van Buuren songs
Songs written by Armin van Buuren
Bonnie McKee songs
Songs written by Bonnie McKee
Armada Music singles
Songs written by Benno de Goeij